Orlando Semedo Monteiro (born 18 May 1972) is a retired footballer who played as a forward.

Club career
Born in Praia, Portuguese Cape Verde, Monteiro spent his entire professional career in Portugal, mostly in its Segunda Liga. His Primeira Liga input consisted of two seasons with Lisbon-based club C.F. Estrela da Amadora, his debut in the competition occurring on 30 September 1995 when he came on as a 72nd-minute substitute in a 1–1 home draw against C.S. Marítimo.

Monteiro retired in 2004 at the age of 32, after splitting the campaign with lower league club F.C. Lixa and S.C. Covilhã in the second division.

References

External links

1972 births
Living people
Sportspeople from Praia
Footballers from Santiago, Cape Verde
Cape Verdean footballers
São Tomé and Príncipe footballers
Association football forwards
Primeira Liga players
Liga Portugal 2 players
Segunda Divisão players
Seixal F.C. players
S.C.U. Torreense players
C.F. Estrela da Amadora players
Académico de Viseu F.C. players
Moreirense F.C. players
F.C. Penafiel players
F.C. Lixa players
S.C. Covilhã players
São Tomé and Príncipe international footballers
Cape Verdean expatriate footballers
Expatriate footballers in Portugal
Cape Verdean expatriate sportspeople in Portugal